Detroit Beach is an unincorporated community and census-designated place (CDP) in Monroe County in the U.S. state of Michigan.  The population was 1,957 at the 2020 census.  The CDP is located within Frenchtown Charter Township, and as an unincorporated community, Detroit Beach has no legal autonomy of its own.

Detroit Beach and its surrounding communities are served by Jefferson Schools.

History
The community of Detroit Beach was established by the Industrial Development Company in 1923 and so named in order to attract lot buyers from Detroit.

Geography

The area defined by the CDP is bounded on the northeast by South Grove Drive, on the northwest by North Dixie Highway, and on the southwest by the Sandy Creek and Sterling State Park. Detroit Beach is the main community, but the CDP also extends to include residents and storefronts along North Dixie Highway, as well as the Frenchtown Harbor condominiums and a small portion of Grand Beach. The CDP of Woodland Beach borders to the northeast.

Demographics

As of the census of 2000, there were 2,289 people, 791 households, and 620 families residing in the community. The racial makeup of the community was 98.08% White, 0.13% African American, 0.31% Native American, 0.04% Asian, 0.09% from other races, and 1.35% from two or more races. Hispanic or Latino of any race were 0.96% of the population.

There were 791 households, out of which 38.8% had children under the age of 18 living with them, 60.2% were married couples living together, 12.3% had a female householder with no husband present, and 21.5% were non-families. 16.4% of all households were made up of individuals, and 4.9% had someone living alone who was 65 years of age or older.  The average household size was 2.88 and the average family size was 3.23.

In the community, the population was spread out, with 28.6% under the age of 18, 8.6% from 18 to 24, 34.0% from 25 to 44, 21.2% from 45 to 64, and 7.7% who were 65 years of age or older.  The median age was 34 years. For every 100 females, there were 102.2 males.  For every 100 females age 18 and over, there were 100.6 males.

The median income for a household in the community was $56,528, and the median income for a family was $58,393. Males had a median income of $47,333 versus $30,000 for females. The per capita income for the community was $21,025.  About 2.7% of families and 3.9% of the population were below the poverty line, including none of those under age 18 and 8.0% of those age 65 or over.

References

External links
 Detroit Beach Association website

Unincorporated communities in Monroe County, Michigan
Census-designated places in Michigan
Michigan populated places on Lake Erie
1923 establishments in Michigan
Populated places established in 1923
Unincorporated communities in Michigan
Census-designated places in Monroe County, Michigan